Shing Fuk, formerly called Ka Fuk, is one of the 17 constituencies in the North District, Hong Kong.

The constituency returns one district councillor to the North District Council, with an election every four years.

Shing Fuk constituency has an estimated population of 14,726.

Councillors represented

Election results

2010s

References

Fanling
Constituencies of Hong Kong
Constituencies of North District Council
1999 establishments in Hong Kong
Constituencies established in 1999